Phillip, Philip, or Phil Johnson may refer to:

Sports
Phil Johnson (basketball, born 1941), former basketball player and coach
Phil Johnson (basketball, born 1958), assistant men's basketball coach at UTEP since 2012
Tony Johnson (rower) (Philip Anthony Johnson, born 1940), American rower
Philip Johnson (tennis) (born 1964), American tennis player
Philip G. Johnson (horseman) (1925–2004), American horseman
Philip Johnson (rugby league), rugby league footballer in England

Law, politics, crime
J. Philip Johnson (born 1938), North Dakota judge
Phil Johnson (judge) (born 1944), justice of the Texas Supreme Court
Philip Johnson (congressman) (1818–1867), U.S. Congressman from Pennsylvania
Phillip E. Johnson (1940–2019), professor of law and one of the founders of the intelligent design movement
Philip Francis Johnson (1835–1926), Irish nationalist political labour activist
Philip N. Johnson (born 1955), armored car guard who stole approximately $19 million

Other
Philip Johnson (1906–2005), American architect
Philip Johnson (UK architect) (born 1972), UK architect
Philip G. Johnson (1894–1944), President of Boeing
Philip S. Johnson (1953–2011), American violinist and thief of the Ames Stradivarius
Philip Johnson (actor) (born 1991), American actor

See also
Philip Johnson-Laird (born 1936), professor of psychology
Philip Johnston (disambiguation)
Phil Johnston (footballer) (born 1990), Scottish footballer
Phil Johnstone (born 1957), musician